Rosa Visiedo Claverol is the Chancellor of CEU Cardinal Herrera University. She took up the post on October 14, 2011.

Education
Visiedo Claverol received her Bachelor's degree in Information Sciences (journalism) at the Polytechnic University of Valencia, and her doctorate of Information Sciences(Marketing) at the Complutense University of Madrid.

She has held various positions at CEU Cardinal Herrera University, including Secretary General, Vice Chancellor for Students and Quality, Vice Chancellor of Communication, Quality and European Convergence, Dean of the Faculty of Social Sciences and Law.

References 

Academic staff of CEU Cardinal Herrera University
Living people
Year of birth missing (living people)
Complutense University of Madrid alumni